Dick is a 1999 American comedy film directed by Andrew Fleming from a script he wrote with Sheryl Longin. It is a comic reimagining of the Watergate scandal which ended the presidency of Richard Nixon and features several cast members from Saturday Night Live and The Kids in the Hall. Kirsten Dunst and Michelle Williams star as Betsy and Arlene, two warm-hearted but unworldly 15-year-old friends, who – through various arbitrary circumstances – become the legendary "Deep Throat" figure who played a key role in bringing down the presidency of Nixon (played by Dan Hedaya). At the time of the movie's release, the real identity of Deep Throat was not yet known to the public.

Plot

Betsy Jobs and Arlene Lorenzo are two sweet-natured, ditzy teenagers living in Washington D.C. in 1972. Betsy comes from a wealthy Georgetown family, while Arlene lives with her widowed mother in an apartment in the Watergate building.

On the night of the Watergate break-in, the girls sneak out of Arlene's to mail a letter to enter a contest to win a date with teen idol singer Bobby Sherman. They sneak through the parking garage by taping the latch of a door, accidentally causing the break-in to be discovered. Seen by G. Gordon Liddy, they panic and run. The security guard is startled by the taped door, calls the police, who immediately arrest the burglars.

The next day, at the White House on a school tour, they happen across Liddy again. They don't recognize him, but he recognizes them and becomes suspicious. He points them out to H. R. Haldeman, who interrogates them. Their conversation (revealing the girls don't think about the president much) is interrupted by a phone call from his wife, and then by President Nixon himself, who takes Haldeman aside to complain about the bugging operation being fouled up.

The girls are awestruck at being in the same room as Nixonbut more so at being able to play with his dog, which gives him an idea. To keep their silence, he appoints them his official dog-walkerswhich means they must be admitted repeatedly to the White House. On these visits they accidentally influence major events such as the Vietnam peace process and the Nixon–Brezhnev accord, by bringing along cookies that they have inadvertently baked marijuana into. 

Later, when Betsy's brother, Larry, reveals the cookies' "secret ingredient" and hears the President ate them, he concludes that this explains Nixon's paranoia. The girls become familiar with the Nixon administration's key players, including Henry Kissinger, and accidentally learn the major secrets of the Watergate scandal.

Arlene, previously infatuated with Bobby Sherman, now falls equally hard for the president. Just after reading an -minute message of love into his tape recorder, she plays back another part of the tape, hears his coarse, brutal rantings, and realizes his true nature. When they confront Nixon, he fires and threatens them.

They now reevaluate what they have learned and decide to reveal everything to the "radical muckraking bastards" (Nixon's words) at the Washington Post, Bob Woodward and Carl Bernstein. So they become informants: two 15-year-old girls are the true identity of the famous Deep Throat (Betsy's brother had just been caught watching the film of the same name). 

Woodward and Bernsteinportrayed as petty, childish, and incompetentare naturally skeptical of the two girls. To make matters worse, their only piece of physical evidence, a list of names of those involved from the Committee to Re-Elect the President, is eaten by Betsy's dog.

Nixon's men realize the girls are a real threat and attempt tactics such as bugging and undercover agents to find out what they know, going so far as to break into Betsy's house and plant an agent as Arlene's mother's boyfriend. Eventually pushed to the limit after being chased by the Watergate "plumbers", they decide to take action.

Sneaking into Haldeman's house, the girls find and take a crucial tape recording. They give a transcription of it to Woodward and Bernstein (keeping the tape as a "souvenir") thus ending Nixon's political career. Nixon finds Arlene's message on his tape and erases it, reasoning that he'd be "crucified" if it was perceived that he had an affair with a 15-year-old girl. 

After his resignation, as his helicopter flies over Betsy's house, the girls hold up a sign with the phrase "You suck, Dick", further angering the now ex-president.

Cast

 Kirsten Dunst as Betsy Jobs
 Michelle Williams as Arlene Lorenzo
 Dan Hedaya as President Richard "Dick" Nixon 
 Bruce McCulloch as Carl Bernstein
 Will Ferrell as Bob Woodward
 Saul Rubinek as Henry Kissinger
 Teri Garr as Helen Lorenzo
 Dave Foley as H. R. Haldeman
 Harry Shearer as G. Gordon Liddy
 Ted McGinley as Roderick
 Karl Pruner as Frank Jobs
 Devon Gummersall as Larry Jobs
 Jim Breuer as John Dean
 G. D. Spradlin as Ben Bradlee
 Ryan Reynolds as Chip
 French Stewart as The Interviewer
 Ana Gasteyer as Rose Mary Woods

Production
Writers Andrew Fleming and Sheryl Longin attempted to write several different scripts with teenage girls as protagonists.  The idea of using the Watergate scandal came from a real-life experience Longin had with Nixon when her family stayed at the same hotel as Nixon.  As a child, she and a friend pelted Nixon with ice cubes, causing a minor disturbance.  Fleming said that he was surprised at the attempts to rehabilitate Nixon's image, and Longin cited the Watergate scandal as a defining political moment for their generation.  She said she channeled the resulting anger and cynicism into the script.  Several people told the duo that various gags went too far.  Fleming, who believed Nixon got off easily, said they fought to keep everything.  They approached Ben Bradlee and John Dean to play themselves, but both declined.

Release
Sony's marketing research indicated teenage girls were the film's biggest demographic, so promotional material focused on Dunst and Williams instead of the political aspects.  Dick was released in the US on August 4, 1999.  It grossed $2.2 million in its opening weekend, opening at No. 12 in 1522 theaters.  It went on to gross $6.3 million in the US.

Home media
On December 14, 1999, Dick was released on VHS and DVD by Columbia TriStar Home Video. Eighteen years later, on November 6, 2018, it was released on Blu-ray by Sony Pictures Home Entertainment.

Reception
On Rotten Tomatoes, Dick has a 72% approval rating based on 74 reviews, with an average score of 6.4/10 and the consensus: "A clever, funny slice of alternate history, Dick farcically re-imagines the Watergate era and largely succeeds, thanks to quirky, winning performances from Michelle Williams, Kirsten Dunst and Will Ferrell." On Metacritic, the film has a score of 65 out of 100 based on reviews from 21 critics.

Leonard Maltin gave the film three stars, calling it a "clever cross of Clueless and All the President’s Men".  Todd McCarthy, in his review for Variety, called it an "audacious, imaginative political comedy" that will appeal more to adults than teenagers.  Stephen Holden of The New York Times described it as "an uproariously dizzy satire" that was inspired by the Lewinsky scandal.  Writing for the Los Angeles Times, Kevin Thomas said the film "is so sharp and funny it should appeal to all ages".  Rita Kempley of The Washington Post described  it as "more fun than you ever thought you'd have with Richard Nixon".  The film's acting received critical commentary.  Thomas positively compared Hedaya's performance to Anthony Hopkins in Nixon, and Kempley called Hedaya "no less adept" than Hopkins. Holden wrote that Hedaya's portrayal of Nixon is "the year's funniest film caricature". Thomas called Dunst and Williams "a constant delight".

Awards

Soundtrack

All fifteen compositions are Top 40 hit songs from the 1970s, but two weren't recorded until after the Watergate scandal had ended. They are "Lady Marmalade" and "Dancing Queen" which were released three months and two years later respectively. Sixpence None the Richer's cover version of the latter song is the album's opening track and the only one recorded for the movie.

Captain & Tennille's "Love Will Keep Us Together" had been considered for use in the film, but the politically conservative Daryl Dragon and Toni Tennille did not appreciate the movie's irreverence and denied the rights to their cover. Led Zeppelin's "Over the Hills and Far Away" was originally intended to accompany the closing scene, but Fleming eventually realized Carly Simon's "You're So Vain" was a better fit and used it instead.

Soundtrack album listing

Notes

References

External links

 
 

1999 films
1990s buddy comedy films
1990s teen comedy films
American buddy comedy films
American female buddy films
American political comedy films
American political satire films
American teen comedy films
1990s English-language films
Cultural depictions of Richard Nixon
Cultural depictions of Henry Kissinger
Films set in the 1970s
Films set in 1972
Films set in Washington, D.C.
Films set in the White House
Phoenix Pictures films
Watergate scandal in film
Columbia Pictures films
Films scored by John Debney
Films directed by Andrew Fleming
Films produced by Gale Anne Hurd
Films about Richard Nixon
Independence Day (United States) films
1999 comedy films
1990s female buddy films
1990s American films